The 2014 Los Angeles County Board of Supervisors elections were held on June 3, 2014. Two of the five seats (for the First and Third Districts) of the Los Angeles County Board of Supervisors were contested in this election. A run-off election was held for the Third District on November 4, 2014, as no single candidate failed to reach a majority vote.

Gloria Molina and Zev Yaroslavsky, incumbent Supervisors for the First and Third Districts respectively, were termed out.

Results

First District

Third District

June 3, 2014 election

November, 2014 run-off election

References

External links 
Los Angeles County Department of Registrar-Recorder/County Clerk

Los Angeles County
Los Angeles County Board of Supervisors elections
Los Angeles County